Varane Avashyamund is a 2020 Indian Malayalam-language romantic comedy film written and directed by Anoop Sathyan, son of Sathyan Anthikad, in his debut. It was produced by Dulquer Salmaan. The film stars Suresh Gopi, Dulquer Salmaan, Shobana and Kalyani Priyadarshan. It has music by Alphons Joseph. It marked the comeback of Suresh Gopi after a five-year hiatus from acting.

Principal photography began on 1 October 2019 at Chennai, Tamil Nadu. The film was released on 7 February 2020.

Plot
Neena is a divorced woman in Chennai trying to get hired as a French tutor and teaching classical dance, and she has a daughter Nikhitha aka Nikki. Her brother Manuel also resides in a flat in Chennai. Their next-door neighbors are Major Unnikrishnan, a retired Indian Army officer who has a pet dog, Jimmy (a brown doberman), and Bibeesh who lives with a serial-actress aunt and his young school-going brother, Kartik.

Nikki is looking for a groom through a matrimonial portal and she is very picky. She keeps on rejecting all the alliances that come to her. She casually tells her friends that she once really liked a guy named Aby but she did not pursue the relationship because his mom joked about her looks. Her friends message him from her phone when she was not around and then the two start seeing each other again. Nikki also gets really close with Aby's mom Dr. Sherly.

Major Unnikrishnan has anger management issues and he starts going to a Dr. Bose to get himself treated. Neena also goes to the same place to teach dance. Slowly they start a liking for each other. Noticing this their flatmates start to gossip and it reaches Nikki's ears as well. Nikki questions Neena and Neena does not deny this. Nikki tells her fiance about this and he immediately breaks up. Nikki starts hating her mother because of this. She tells Neena that more than her fiance, she misses his mom a lot.

Bibeesh is also in love with his colleague, but it does not work out. Turns out that she has a boyfriend. During this time, their flat becomes flooded, and Bibeesh and his brother shift to Nikki's house. Slowly they fall in love. One night Bibeesh and Kartik have a disgusting fight and Nikki stops the quarrel by taking Bibeesh onto the top of the terrace.

Bibeesh then opens up about his personal life with Nikki. He keeps describing various incidents, he says that his younger brother was born to their parents in 11th standard and his friends mocked at him because his mother was their class teacher. After a year he loses his father in an accident and his mother because his father didn't use to wear a helmet. He narrates the day when his father died to be the worst, he says that he always had an extra pair of keys in his school bag but unfortunately on that particular day he has forgotten his another pair of keys and he has to wait in his neighbour's house for time being, meanwhile Bibeesh recollects about a gross experience of vomiting after sipping a squash that he has drunk at his neighbours house and feels that in any moment of his life, even a thought about that incident will still give him vomiting sensation. His heart wrenching story about losing his parents during his school time itself makes Nikki realise how much her mother loves her and they patch up. Meanwhile, Major Unnikrishnan ends up saying Neena looks like actress Shobana instead, who he finds very attractive. Finally film ends Bibeesh and Nikki go out on a date which became upset by the Nikki's ex groom a sincere traffic police who once rejected by Nikki for asking her challans to pay in a date.

Cast

Production
On 12 April 2019, The Times of India reported that Suresh Gopi, Shobana and Nazriya Nazim will be starring in a drama film directed by debutant Anoop Sathyan, son of veteran filmmaker Sathyan Anthikad. It marked the comeback of the superstar Suresh Gopi, after a brief hiatus. Later, Nazriya was replaced by Kalyani Priyadarshan. On 17 September 2019, The New Indian Express reported that Dulquer Salmaan will also be starring in the film and producing it. Urvashi was also confirmed to play an important role. Filming was said to begin by October 2019 in Chennai, Tamil Nadu. The film also marked the on-screen collaboration of Suresh Gopi and Shobana after a period of 14 years, after working together in Makalkku (2005).

The principal photography of the film began on 1 October 2019 in Chennai, with both Dulquer and Kalyani shared pictures from sets on their social media accounts. The filming was officially launched by filmmaker Lal Jose. On 4 October 2019, Suresh Gopi began shooting his portions. Dulquer joined the sets for filming on 11 October 2019. On 26 November 2019, Urvashi's shooting for the film commenced. Filming was completed on 21 December 2019, with Dulquer shared a picture expressing thanks on Instagram. Bhagyalakshmi dubbed for Shobhana and Singer Anne Amie for Kalyani Priyadarshan.

Soundtrack

Release
The film was released on 7 February 2020. The movie was released on Netflix and Sun NXT on 20 April 2020 with English subtitles.

Reception
The Times of India critic rated 3 out of 5 stars and wrote that the film's strengths lie "in the moving moments when each of the four characters talk about their past.... Varane Avashyamund is a feel-good movie for all audience and probably all seasons, because it is all heart."

Box office
In the overseas opening weekend, it grossed US$93,932 (₹67.06 lakhs) from 44 screens in the United States, US$13,215 (₹9.44 lakhs) from 8 screens in the Canada, NZ$16,353 (₹7.52 lakhs) from 6 screens in New Zealand and S$7,920 (₹4.07 lakhs) from 2 screens in the Singapore. It grossed US$174,538 (₹1.3 crore) in United States in five weeks, US$22,537 (₹16.27 lakhs) in Canada in two weeks, £62,690 (₹58.25 lakhs) in United Kingdom in two weeks, A$4,016 (₹1.91 lakhs) in Australia in three weeks, NZ$22,849 (₹10.39 lakhs) in New Zealand in two weeks, €3,240 (₹2.59 lakhs) in Germany in three weeks and S$12,450 (₹6.67 lakhs) in Singapore in three weeks.

Awards
At 10th South Indian International Movie Awards, Shobana won Best Actress, Anoop won Best Debut Director, Kalyani won Best Debut Actress, and Antony won Best Actor in a Comedy Role.

References

External links
 

2020 films
2020 romantic comedy-drama films
2020s Malayalam-language films
Films scored by Alphons Joseph
Indian romantic comedy-drama films
Films set in Chennai
Films shot in Chennai